The 1949 All-Ireland Minor Hurling Championship was the 19th staging of the All-Ireland Minor Hurling Championship since its establishment by the Gaelic Athletic Association in 1928.

Waterford entered the championship as the defending champions, however, they were beaten by Tipperary in the Munster semi-final.

On 4 September 1949 Tipperary won the championship following a 6-5 to 2-4 defeat of Kilkenny in the All-Ireland final. This was their sixth All-Ireland title and their first in two championship seasons.

Results

All-Ireland Minor Hurling Championship

Semi-finals

Final

External links
 All-Ireland Minor Hurling Championship: Roll Of Honour

Minor
All-Ireland Minor Hurling Championship